Horné Zelenice is a village and municipality in Hlohovec District in the Trnava Region of western Slovakia.

History
In historical records the village was first mentioned in 1244.

Geography
The municipality lies at an altitude of 138 metres and covers an area of 4.249 km². It has a population of about 655 people.

Genealogical resources

The records for genealogical research are available at the state archive "Statny Archiv in Bratislava, Nitra, Slovakia"

 Roman Catholic church records (births/marriages/deaths): 1771-1911 (parish A)
 Lutheran church records (births/marriages/deaths): 1792-1928 (parish A)

See also
 List of municipalities and towns in Slovakia

References

External links
Statistics
Surnames of living people in Horne Zelenice

Villages and municipalities in Hlohovec District